Phragmipedium boissierianum is a species of orchid occurring from southern Ecuador to Peru.

References

External links 

boissierianum
Orchids of Ecuador
Orchids of Peru